Shaun Barry Haig (born 19 March 1982) is a New Zealand former cricketer who played first-class and List A cricket for Otago. A right-handed batsman and occasional wicket-keeper, Haig was contracted to the team between 2006 and 2011.

He is now an umpire and stood in matches in the 2015–16 Plunket Shield season. In June 2016 he was added to the International Panel of Umpires and Referees.

On 3 January 2017 he stood in his first Twenty20 International (T20I) match, between New Zealand and Bangladesh.

In January 2018, he was named as one of the seventeen on-field umpires for the 2018 Under-19 Cricket World Cup.

See also
 List of One Day International cricket umpires
 List of Twenty20 International cricket umpires

References

1982 births
Living people
New Zealand cricketers
Otago cricketers
New Zealand cricket umpires
New Zealand One Day International cricket umpires
New Zealand Twenty20 International cricket umpires